The 1983 South Pacific Games was the seventh edition where football was introduced and was held in Western Samoa from 20–30 August 1983.

The final of the competition, between Fiji and Tahiti, was disrupted by a fight between the players after Tahiti scored a goal in the closing minutes. A referee was injured and a Fijian player was arrested.

Group stage

Group A

Group B
 withdrew

Group C

Knockout stage

Quarter-finals

Semi-finals

Bronze medal match

Gold medal match

Sources:

References

1983
Football at the Pacific Games
Pac
P
1983 Pacific Games